Charcoal is a 2022 Argentine-Brazilian drama film written and directed by Carolina Markowicz.

Plot 
In the São Paulo countryside, a rural peasant family struggle to care for their ailing patriarch; one day, however, an Argentine drug lord arrives with an offer to give them a substantial amount of money conditional on permitting him to kill the old man and take his place as part of his efforts to hide out from criminal prosecution.

Cast 
 César Bordón as Miguel
 Rômulo Braga
 Jean de Almeida Costa as Jean
 Maeve Jinkings as Irene
 Camila Márdila as Luciana
 Aline Marta Maia
 Pedro Wagner

Release 
The film premiered in the Platform Prize program at the 2022 Toronto International Film Festival on September 11, 2022. It has also been announced as part of the Latin Horizons program at the 70th San Sebastián International Film Festival.

References

External links 
 

2022 films
2022 black comedy films
2022 drama films
Argentine black comedy films
Argentine drama films
Brazilian black comedy films
Brazilian drama films
2020s Spanish-language films
2020s Portuguese-language films
2020s Argentine films
Black comedy films
Films about euthanasia
Films about suicide